Horace Thomas Perry (29 November 1905 – 25 December 1962) was a cricketer who played one first-class match for Somerset in 1927.  He was born at Bedminster, Bristol.

Perry batted at No 8 in the two Somerset innings of the match against Lancashire at Old Trafford, which Lancashire won in two days. He made nine in the first innings and was out for a duck in the second. Cricket websites agree that he batted right-handed and suggest that he bowled right-handed and fast. However, in his one first-class match, he did not bowl.

Perry died, aged 57, at Kingsdown, Bristol.

References

1905 births
1962 deaths
English cricketers
Somerset cricketers